From the Carpet is an acoustic EP by The Academy Is..., released as a digital-only release on February 21, 2006. It included three songs from Almost Here: "The Phrase That Pays", "Down and Out" and "Black Mamba"; new songs "Pour Yourself a Drink" and "The Fever"; as well as a cover of John Lennon's "Working Class Hero". For the recording, the band returned to The Gallery of Carpet studio to work with engineer Brian Zieske, who produced and recorded their self-titled EP, before the band appended the "Is..." to their name.

Track listing

References

External links

From the Carpet at YouTube (streamed copy where licensed)

The Academy Is... albums
2006 EPs
Fueled by Ramen EPs